Drogoradz  (formerly German Hammer, Amt Jasenitz) – is a village in the administrative district of Gmina Police, within Police County, West Pomeranian Voivodeship, in north-western Poland, close to the German border.

History 

For the history of the region, see History of Pomerania.

Drogoradz, known as Hammer to its residents while part of Germany from 1815 – 1945, became part of Poland after the end of World War II and changed its name to the Polish Drogoradz.

Below is a timeline showing the history of the different administrations that this city has been included in.

Political-administrative membership
  1815 – 1866: German Confederation, Kingdom of Prussia, Pomerania
 1866 – 1871: North German Confederation, Kingdom of Prussia, Pomerania
  1871 – 1918: German Empire, Kingdom of Prussia, Pomerania
  1919 – 1933: Weimarer Republik, Free State of Prussia, Pomerania
  1933 – 1945: Nazi Germany, Pomerania
  1945 – 1946: Enclave Police, (the area reporting to the Red Army)
  1946 – 1952: People's Republic of Poland, Szczecin Voivodeship
  1952 – 1975: People's Republic of Poland, Szczecin Voivodeship
  1975 – 1989: People's Republic of Poland, Szczecin Voivodeship
  1989 – 1998: Poland, Szczecin Voivodeship
  1999 – Current: Poland, Western Pomerania, powiat Police County, gmina Police

Demography
 The village has a population:
 1939 – 505
 1972 – 350
 2006 – 250

Tourism 
 PTTK path (green footpath  Trail of Ornithologists-Szlak Ornitologów) in an area of Drogoradz in Wkrzanska Forest.

References

See also 

 Police
 Szczecin

Drogoradz